is the 16th game in the Touhou Project series. It was announced on the developer ZUN's blog on April 20, 2017. A playable demo was released on May 7, 2017, at Reitaisai 14, and the full version was released at Comiket 92 on August 11, 2017. The game was released on Steam worldwide on November 17, 2017, becoming the first game in the series to be available on the platform.

Gameplay

Hidden Star in Four Seasons is a vertically scrolling shoot 'em up game, in which the player is always facing upwards, and is required to maneuver around enemy projectiles, shooting enemies that appear from the top of the screen, and fighting bosses that appear twice in each stage.

Hidden Star in Four Seasons has a unique mechanic known as the Season Gauge. This gauge is filled by collecting season items, which appear when the player’s bullets connect with an enemy, or when the player grazes a bullet shot by an enemy. When the season gauge is filled, a miniature orbital that shoots smaller projectiles appears behind the player, and the gauge empties; it can be refilled, with each filled gauge adding another orbital, up to a maximum of six. The effect and appearance of these orbitals differs depending on the “sub-season”, which is chosen at the beginning of the game, which include:

 Spring: This option makes the orbitals appear as small Yin-Yang orbs. They fire small projectiles that home in on enemies and bosses.

 Summer: This option makes the orbitals appear as little rotating ice cubes. They shoot ice shards aimlessly in all directions in front of them.

 Fall: This makes the orbitals appear as crows. They shoot orange projectiles in the general shape of the letter V.

 Winter: This makes the orbitals appear as blue orbs with snowflakes inside of them. They shoot thin lasers.

 Dog days: This is a special sub-season only useable in the Extra Stage. It appears as a small pink orb and shoots powerful projectiles behind the player.

Additionally, the player can use the season gauge to do a  season release by pressing the C key. This allows the player to use the season gauge to create a circle of varying sizes around the player character. This circle clears enemy bullets, but does not make the player invincible, and usually costs all of the mini orbitals and sets the season gauge back to zero, ready to be filled again.

Plot 
Despite it being midsummer, the seasons in various locations vary wildly. The Hakurei Shrine is showered in cherry petals, Youkai Mountain is basking in the middle of autumn, and the Forest of Magic is blanketed in snow, and thanks to some strange force, Gensokyo's fairies are running rampant with unfathomable strength. In the midst of this undeniable incident, the heroines, Reimu Hakurei, Marisa Kirisame, Aya Shameimaru, and Cirno set out to investigate and find the perpetrator behind it.

After searching through various areas in Gensokyo, your heroine of choice finds The Land of the Backdoor, a mysterious dimension full of misty purple smoke and doors that lead to various places across Gensokyo. Inside, the heroine finds Satono and Mai, whom after being fought, direct the heroine to Okina Matara, the perpetrator of the incident and the god who caused the seasons in Gensokyo to shift. Her true intention was to remind Gensokyo of her strength and to find replacements for her servants, Mai and Satono, and by causing the seasons to shift, she thought she would brought out the strongest in Gensokyo and the people most fit to serve her. Unfortunately for Okina, all of the main heroines are deemed unfit to be her servants (Except for Marisa Kirisame, who declines of her own free will.) This leads to a fight between Okina and the heroine of choice, with the heroine ultimately losing and being forced out of The Land of the Backdoor.

Characters

Playable Characters 
 Reimu Hakurei - Attacks with homing cherry blossom petals.
 Marisa Kirisame - Attacks with lasers.
 Aya Shameimaru - Attacks with gusts of wind.
 Cirno - Attacks with icicles.

Boss Characters 
 Eternity Larva - Stage 1 midboss, Stage 1 boss. She is a butterfly fairy and a possible god.
 Nemuno Sakata - Stage 2 midboss, Stage 2 boss. She is a yamanba.
 Lily White - Stage 3 midboss. She is a fairy who heralds the coming of spring.
 Aunn Komano - Stage 3 boss. She is a statue who came to life. She watches over temples and shrines.
 Narumi Yatadera - Stage 4 boss. She is a jizo statue who lives in the Forest of Magic.
 Satono Nishida - Stage 5 midboss, Stage 5 boss (with Mai), Extra Stage midboss (with Mai). She is one of Okina’s servants and dancers. 
 Mai Teireida - Stage 4 midboss, Stage 5 boss (with Satono), Extra Stage midboss (with Satono). She is one of Okina’s servants and dancers.
 Okina Matara - Stage 6 boss, Extra Stage boss. She is a secret god with many names and titles. She is also the main antagonist. She lives in the Land of the Back Door with her servants.

References

2017 video games
Touhou Project games
Bullet hell video games
Shoot 'em ups
Video games developed in Japan
Windows games
Windows-only games